Robert Edwin Wadkins (born July 26, 1951) is an American professional golfer. His older brother, Lanny, won 21 times on the PGA Tour, including the 1977 PGA Championship, and is a member of the World Golf Hall of Fame.

Wadkins was born in Richmond, Virginia. Between Bobby and Lanny, they held the Richmond, Virginia city junior title for six consecutive years – two by Bobby and four by Lanny. After attending the University of Houston for one year, Wadkins earned All-American honors in 1972–73 at East Tennessee State University.

Wadkins turned pro in 1973. He never won on the PGA Tour despite six runner-up finishes in 715 events, but he did win on the European Tour and the Japan Golf Tour. Since turning 50, he has played on the Champions Tour and won four times, including one senior major, the 2006 Senior Players Championship. Wadkins is tied with Mark Wiebe as the Champions Tour's youngest winner at the age of 50 years and 10 days when he captured the Lightpath Long Island Classic.

Amateur wins
1972 Virginia State Amateur

Professional wins (10)

European Tour wins (1)

European Tour playoff record (1–0)

Japan Golf Tour Tour wins (2)

Other wins (4)
1981 Virginia PGA Open
1982 Virginia PGA Open
1983 Virginia PGA Open
1990 Fred Meyer Challenge (with Lanny Wadkins)

Champions Tour wins (4)

Playoff record
PGA Tour playoff record (0–2)

Results in major championships

Note: Wadkins never played in The Open Championship.

CUT = missed the half-way cut
WD = withdrew
"T" = tied

Summary

Most consecutive cuts made – 6 (twice)
Longest streak of top-10s – 2 (1987 U.S. Open – 1987 PGA)

Results in The Players Championship

CUT = missed the halfway cut
"T" indicates a tie for a place

Senior major championships

Wins (1)

Results timeline
Results not in chronological order before 2017.

The Senior British Open was not a senior major until 2003.

CUT = missed the halfway cut
WD = withdrew
"T" indicates a tie for a place

See also
1974 PGA Tour Qualifying School graduates
1997 Nike Tour graduates

References

External links

American male golfers
East Tennessee State Buccaneers men's golfers
PGA Tour golfers
PGA Tour Champions golfers
Winners of senior major golf championships
Korn Ferry Tour graduates
Golfers from Virginia
Sportspeople from Richmond, Virginia
1951 births
Living people